The Capella Resort, Singapore is a luxury resort situated in  of grounds and gardens located on Sentosa Island, Singapore. It has 112 manors, suites and guestrooms designed by Norman Foster. It was developed by Pontiac Land and officially opened in March 2009. Capella Singapore's long-stay accommodation arm, The Club at Capella Singapore comprises 81 serviced apartments, penthouses and manors.

Architecture and design
The hotel, which opened in 2009, was designed by architectural firm Foster and Partners in collaboration with DP Architects Pte Ltd. Its interiors were designed by Indonesian interior designer, Jaya Ibrahim. The building integrates two Tanah Merah military buildings dating from the 1880s with a new hotel, villas, event spaces and a spa.

The Tiong Seng Group was the building and civil contractor of the Capella Singapore with Millenia Hotel Pte Ltd. as their client.

2018 North Korea–United States summit

The 2018 United States–North Korea Summit was held at the resort beginning at 9:04 a.m. Singapore Standard Time on 12 June 2018. Singapore announced the several locations related to the Trump-Kim summit would be designated as "Special event areas" and secured by both leaders' own personal security teams, elite Singaporean police, and the Gurkha Contingent of Singapore.

References

External links

 

The Leading Hotels of the World
Hotels in Singapore
Resorts in Singapore
Hotels established in 2009
Sentosa
2009 establishments in Singapore